Hijas del Sol (Spanish, Daughters of the Sun), namely Piruchi Apo Botupá and Paloma Loribo Apo, are an aunt and niece duo from the island of Bioko in Equatorial Guinea who write, sing, and perform songs in both Bube and Spanish.

They first performed together in 1992 for a competition in el Centro Cultural Hispano Guineano, where they won prizes for best original song and best choreography. This African traditional music competition was regarded as their musical breakthrough. That year they also performed for the first time in Spain at both the Expo de Sevilla and in the Festival de la OTI. The duo later moved to Madrid, Spain where they became involved with the local cultural scene and met Manu Chao. Chao later became a mentor to the duo.

Their debut album Sibèba (1995) is a blend of more traditional Bube music and their own compositions, sung in both Bube and Spanish. The album was released by the independent record label Nubenegra. Sibèba ("aquello que se quiere conseguir"), can be translated as, "a place of salvation reserved for the best" and the album tells of the traditions of both Bube culture and Catholics religion as well as the problems that immigrants encounter in modern-day Spain. fRoots placed the album at No.1 in its annual listing for 1995  and the album was also released throughout Europe, the US, Canada and Japan.

Discography

References

Hijas del Sol
Equatoguinean Roman Catholics
Bubi people
Equatoguinean expatriates in Spain
Spanish people of Equatoguinean descent